Al-Hanaya is a town in Iraq, on the Euphrates River. It was mentioned as one of the cities frequently visited by Radhanite merchants.

Hanaya
Populated places on the Euphrates River